The HIV Prevention Trials Network (HPTN) is a worldwide collaborative clinical trials network that brings together investigators, ethicists, community and other partners to develop and test the safety and efficacy of interventions designed to prevent the acquisition and transmission of HIV. HPTN studies evaluate new HIV prevention interventions and strategies in populations and geographical regions that bear a disproportionate burden of infection. The HPTN is committed to the highest ethical standards for its clinical trials and recognizes the importance of community engagement in all phases of the research process.

The HPTN was established in 2000, building on the work of the HIV Network for Prevention Trials (HIVNET). HPTN’s Leadership and Operations Center (LOC) is based at FHI 360, Durham, NC. Its Laboratory Center (LC) is at Johns Hopkins University, Baltimore, MD and Statistical and Data Management Center (SDMC) is housed within the Statistical Center for HIV/AIDS Research and Prevention (SCHARP) at the Fred Hutchinson Cancer Research Center in Seattle, Washington. The HPTN Modelling Centre, part of the SDMC, is a collaboration between the Department of Infectious Diseases Epidemiology at Imperial College London, UK, and SCHARP.

The U.S. National Institute of Allergy and Infectious Diseases, the U.S. National Institute of Mental Health, Office of The Director, the U.S. National Institute on Drug Abuse, and the Eunice Kennedy Shriver National Institute of Child Health and Human Development, all part of the U.S. National Institutes of Health, co-fund the HPTN.

Snapshot
 More than 50 trials ongoing or completed 
 171,000+ study participants enrolled and evaluated
 Over 65 clinical research sites in 14 countries
 750+ publications

Mission statement
The HPTN is dedicated to the discovery and development of new and innovative research strategies to reduce the acquisition and transmission of HIV.

Leadership
The HPTN leadership group is a subset of the Executive Committee (EC). The EC includes investigators from the Clinical Trials Units (CTUs), the Leadership and Operations Center (LOC), the Statistical and Data Management Center (SDMC), the Laboratory Center (LC), Community representatives, National Institutes of Health (NIH) representatives, and other individuals with expertise in HPTN scientific research areas.

The EC, under the direction of HPTN Principal Investigators (PIs) Dr. Myron Cohen, and Dr. Wafaa El-Sadr in conjunction with the NIH, sets the research priorities of the HPTN and directs its scientific agenda.

Network groups and committees
The HPTN is a global network of investigators from Clinical Trials Units (CTUs), Leadership and Operations Center (LOC) which includes recognized experts in HIV prevention, leadership partners from the network Laboratory Center (LC) and Statistical and Data Management Center (SDMC) and various working groups (WGs) and committees charged with the scientific management and operational support of the network.

The EC Chair recommends, and the full EC approves, chair(s) and membership of the HPTN committees. Committee members serve for the duration of the cooperative agreement, and chairs serve three-year terms unless otherwise specified. Terms of committee chairs may be extended with the approval of the EC Chair. In addition to the scientific committees and working groups, there are four key standing Network oversight and operations committees: Science Review Committee (SRC), Study Monitoring Committee (SMC), Manuscript Review Committee (MRC), and Performance Evaluation Committee (PEC).

Research agenda
The HPTN research agenda focuses on the following four priority areas:

 Identifying novel antiretroviral (ARV)-based methods and delivery systems for HIV prevention
 Developing multi-purpose technologies for HIV prevention as well as for contraception and prevention of other sexually transmitted infections
 Evaluating broadly neutralizing antibodies alone or in a combination that prevent HIV acquisition, in collaboration with the HIV Vaccine Trials Network
 Designing and conducting population-specific integrated strategy studies that combine biomedical, socio-behavioral, and structural interventions for HIV prevention to maximize their effectiveness

Pre-exposure prophylaxis (PrEP) strategies
Antiviral Drugs
 HPTN 084-01 (The LIFT Study) is a clinical trial examining whether injectable cabotegravir (CAB) for pre-exposure prophylaxis (PrEP) is safe and acceptable for adolescent females (assigned female at birth).
 HPTN 084 is a Phase III study comparing the efficacy and safety of long-acting injectable cabotegravir (CAB-LA) to Truvada® for prevention of HIV acquisition in women in Botswana, Kenya, Malawi, South Africa, Swaziland, Uganda and Zimbabwe. Data from the HPTN 084 clinical trial indicate that a pre-exposure prophylaxis (PrEP) regimen of long-acting cabotegravir (CAB LA) injections once every eight weeks was safe and superior to daily oral tenofovir/emtricitabine (FTC/TDF) for HIV prevention among cisgender women in sub-Saharan Africa.
 HPTN 083-02 is a clinical trial examining factors influencing adherence to injectable PrEP and retention in an injectable PrEP research study.
 HPTN 083-01 is a clinical trial examining whether injectable cabotegravir (CAB) for PrEP is safe and acceptable for adolescent males [assigned male at birth – including men who have sex with men (MSM), transgender women (TGW), and gender nonconforming people].
 HPTN 083 is a Phase IIb/III study comparing the efficacy and safety of long-acting injectable cabotegravir (CAB-LA) to Truvada® for prevention of HIV acquisition in cisgender MSM and transgender women who have sex with men in Argentina, Brazil, Peru, South Africa, Thailand, the United States and Vietnam. Data from the HPTN 083 clinical trial showed that a pre-exposure prophylaxis (PrEP) regimen containing long-acting cabotegravir (CAB LA) injected once every eight weeks was superior to daily oral tenofovir/emtricitabine (TDF/FTC) for HIV prevention among cisgender men and transgender women who have sex with men.
 HPTN 082 was a Phase IV sub-Saharan-based research study designed to assess the number of and characteristics of young women who accept versus decline pre-exposure prophylaxis (PrEP) at enrollment. The study compared adherence to PrEP between women who are randomized to receive standard adherence support and those receiving enhanced adherence support. HPTN 082 data show pre-exposure prophylaxis (PrEP) use was high but waned after three months among the young African women enrolled in the study.
 HPTN 077 is a Phase IIa study helping determine whether injectable cabotegravir could be used for PrEP in people at greater risk of acquiring HIV.
 HPTN 076 is a Phase II study designed to find out if a new form of the drug rilpivirine is safe and acceptable for use as HIV pre-exposure prophylaxis (PrEP).
 HPTN 073 is a Phase IV demonstration study see if Black men who have sex with men (BMSM) are willing to use Truvada®, a daily pill for pre-exposure prophylaxis (PrEP).
 HPTN 069/ACTG 5305 was a Phase II study designed to learn more about the safety and acceptability of oral maraviroc in at-risk HIV uninfected men who have sex with men (MSM) and in at-risk HIV uninfected women.
 HPTN 052 was a Phase III landmark study proving viral suppression through antiretroviral therapy can prevent HIV transmission. Based on the study’s findings, the World Health Organization recommended antiretroviral treatment be offered to all people living with HIVregardless of CD4 count. Science named this study the 2011 "Breakthrough of the Year".

Data from HPTN 083 and HPTN 084 helped provide important information for the December 20, 2021 decision by the U.S. Food and Drug Administration (FDA) to approve ViiV Healthcare’s long-acting cabotegravir (CAB-LA) injections for the prevention of HIV. Sponsored and co-funded by the National Institute of Allergy and Infectious Diseases (NIAID), part of the National Institutes of Health (NIH), these studies showed that CAB-LA injected once every eight weeks was superior to daily oral tenofovir/emtricitabine (TDF/FTC) for HIV prevention among cisgender men and transgender women who have sex with men (HPTN 083) and cisgender women (HPTN 084). Both studies also demonstrated that CAB-LA was well-tolerated, offering a new and important pre-exposure prophylaxis (PrEP) option for individuals at risk for HIV infection. ViiV Healthcare will market CAB-LA for PrEP under the brand name Apretude.

Monoclonal Antibodies

The HPTN and the HIV Vaccine Trials Network (HVTN) are studying monoclonal antibodies (mAbs) that may protect people from HIV infection. These studies will guide the development of new ways to prevent HIV. They will also guide future vaccine development that could help to end HIV.
 HVTN 804/HPTN 095 is an antiretroviral analytical treatment interruption study to assess immunologic and virologic responses in participants who received VRC01 or placebo and acquired HIV during HVTN 704/HPTN 085.
 HVTN 805/HPTN 093 is an antiretroviral analytical treatment interruption study to assess immunologic and virologic responses in participants who initiated antiretroviral therapy in early HIV infection after having received VRC01 or placebo in HVTN 703/HPTN 081.
 HVTN 140/HPTN 101 is a phase 1 dose-escalation clinical trial to evaluate the safety, tolerability, and pharmacokinetics of PGDM1400LS alone and in combination with VRC07- 523LS and PGT121.414.LS in healthy, HIV-uninfected adult participants. 
 HVTN 136/HPTN 092 is a phase 1 dose-escalation clinical trial to evaluate the safety, tolerability, pharmacokinetics, and antiviral activity of the monoclonal antibody PGT121.414.LS administered alone and in combination with VRC07-523LS via intravenous infusion or via subcutaneous injections in healthy, HIV-uninfected adult participants.
 HVTN 130/HPTN 089 is a Phase I clinical trial to evaluate the safety, tolerability, pharmacokinetics, and antiviral activity of combinations of monoclonal antibodies PGT121, PGDM1400, 10-1074, and VRC07-523LS administered via intravenous infusion in healthy, HIV-uninfected adult participants
 HVTN 127/HPTN 087 is a Phase I study evaluating the safety and serum concentrations of a human monoclonal antibody, VRC-HIVMAB075-00-AB (VRC07-523LS), administered in multiple doses and routes to healthy, HIV-uninfected adults in Switzerland and the United States.
 Antibody Mediated Prevention (AMP), are two Phase IIb studies evaluating the safety and efficacy of VRC01, a broadly neutralizing monoclonal antibody (bnAb), in reducing acquisition of HIV-1 infection among cisgender men and transgender persons (TG) who have sex with men in Brazil, Peru, Switzerland and the United States (HVTN 704/HPTN 085), and sexually active cisgender women in sub-Saharan Africa (HVTN 703/HPTN 081). Findings from the proof-of-concept AMP studies demonstrated VRC01 was effective at preventing the acquisition of HIV strains that were sensitive to the bnAb. This was assessed by a laboratory test that measures a virus’ susceptibility to neutralization by an antibody.

Integrated strategies
 HPTN 096 is a study assessing an integrated, HIV status-neutral, population-based approach designed to reduce HIV incidence among Black MSM in the U.S. South by increasing HIV testing, pre-exposure prophylaxis (PrEP) use among Black MSM living without HIV, and viral suppression rates among Black MSM living with HIV.
 HPTN 094 or “INTEGRA” is a vanguard study to determine the efficacy of using a mobile health unit to provide integrated health services - particularly medication for opioid use disorder (OUD) and medication for HIV treatment or prevention - to people with OUD who inject drugs in five U.S. cities.
 HPTN 091 is a study assessing the feasibility, acceptability, preliminary impact of a multi-component strategy that provides HIV prevention services, gender-affirming hormone therapy, and peer health navigation to improve pre-exposure prophylaxis (PrEP) uptake and adherence among transgender women in the Americas.
 HPTN 078 was a US-based research study designed to develop and determine the effectiveness of a combined HIV prevention strategy that includes a method to identify, recruit, and link men who have sex with men (MSM) to HIV care and an intervention to help HIV-infected MSM achieve and maintain viral suppression (low level of HIV in the body). Findings from HPTN 078 show engaging disenfranchised men who have sex with men (MSM) living with HIV in the U.S. is possible, but the best way to help them achieve and maintain viral suppression is not yet known.
 HPTN 075 was an observational study aimed to evaluate the feasibility of HIV prevention research among men who have sex with men and transgender women in three countries in sub-Saharan Africa. Findings from the study showed participants were at an alarming risk for getting HIV. The incidence among study participants was substantially higher than the estimated incidence among heterosexual men and women in the general population in the same countries.
 HPTN 074 was a Phase III study aimed to determine the feasibility of a future trial that would assess whether an integrated intervention combining psychosocial counseling and supported referrals for antiretroviral therapy (ART) at any CD4 cell count and substance use treatment for HIV-infected people who inject drugs (PWID) would reduce HIV transmission to HIV-uninfected injection partners, as compared to routine care dictated by national guidelines for HIV-infected PWID. At 52 weeks from enrollment, participants in the intervention arm nearly doubled their antiretroviral therapy usage, viral suppression and medication-assisted treatment usage compared to the standard of care arm. Mortality was also reduced by more than half with the intervention.
 HPTN 071 Population Effects of Antiretroviral Therapy to Reduce HIV Transmission (PopART) was a research study that examined the impact of a package of HIV prevention interventions on community-level HIV incidence. The prevention interventions included universal voluntary HIV counseling and testing provided at household level, linkage of HIV infected individuals to care and early initiation of antiretroviral therapy (ART) for all those testing HIV-positive. The study was conducted in 21 communities in the Western Cape of South Africa, and in Zambia. Findings show delivery of an HIV prevention strategy that includes offering in-home HIV testing to everyone, with immediate referral to HIV care, and treatment for people living with HIV based on prevailing in-country guidelines, can substantially reduce new HIV infections. Findings from HPTN 071 (PopART) show delivery of an HIV prevention strategy that includes offering in-home HIV testing to everyone, with immediate referral to HIV care, and treatment for people living with HIV based on prevailing in-country guidelines, can substantially reduce new HIV infections. According to projections from mathematical modelling and cost-effectiveness analyses, continuation of community-wide HIV testing and prompt initiation of treatment as delivered in the HPTN 071 (PopART) study in South Africa and Zambia could lead to substantial reductions in new HIV cases, be cost-effective, and help to achieve the UNAIDS 2030 targets.

Scholars program
The HPTN Scholars Program seeks to provide scholar recipients with the knowledge, skills and connections to further their careers as independent investigators in the HIV prevention research field. Domestic and international scientists from groups under-represented in HIV prevention research are encouraged to apply. Successful domestic investigator applicants will have received their terminal degree (MD, PhD, etc.). For international investigators, current MD, PhD, and MBChB students may apply, along with individuals who already graduated with their terminal degree.

Scholars:
 Develop a research project using data from a completed or ongoing HPTN HIV prevention study and complete their scholarship project within the program cycle
 Present the findings of their project at the HPTN Annual Meeting and submit a manuscript at the end of the scholarship cycle
 Become knowledgeable of the process of doing research in NIH-funded HIV networks, and have the opportunity to build their research networks within the context of the HPTN

Scholars are provided funding to cover a portion of their time (typically ~ 10-30%) and expenses including travel and research materials/supplies. Successful applicants will be funded for 18 months, subject to certain restrictions. The HPTN Scholars Program is funded through a supplement from the National Institute of Allergy and Infectious Diseases and the National Institute on Drug Abuse.

Community program
Community participation and engagement are critical in the conduct of scientific research.  There is mutual benefit to communities and researchers when both parties work together throughout the scientific research process. In the HPTN, community participation occurs throughout the network, community and site levels through various mechanisms that include representation on the Ethics Working Group, the Science Review Committee and protocol teams.

References

External links 
 

International medical and health organizations
HIV/AIDS research organisations